European Georgia is a political party in Georgia founded in Tbilisi in January 2017, primarily by prominent former members of the United National Movement. From 2017 to 2021 the party was chaired by Davit Bakradze. Since 2021, the chairman is Giga Bokeria who was chairman of the political council from 2017 to 2021.

History
The party holds seats in the Parliament of Georgia as a result of the 2016 parliamentary election, in which its members ran as part of the opposition United National Movement (UNM). After an internal disagreement, a significant part of the UNM parliamentary caucus and leadership (including Giga Bokeria, Sergi Kapanadze and Elene Khoshtaria) broke away. The breakaway entity took the largely unknown legal vehicle of a previous party whose leadership included Nugzar Tsereteli, father of  Gigi Tsereteli, and had previously run in coalition with the UNM. The breakaway faction in the Parliament initially renamed itself to European Georgia, before choosing the name of Movement for Liberty-European Georgia during a presentation by Davit Bakradze on January 30, 2017. On the same date party leader Gigi Ugulava was named interim secretary general, in place until a party conference could be held.

The party held its first convention on May 27, during which they elected Bakradze as chairman of the party, Ugulava as secretary-general, and approved the party's name as European Georgia - Movement for Liberty.

Ideology 
The party's economic liberal and center-right platform is virtually identical to the UNM's. The main difference between the two parties is their political strategy, with European Georgia historically being more institutional rather than activist. For instance, European Georgia in 2017 displayed a higher willingness toward contesting elections and taking part in the political process compared to the UNM which boycotted the elections. This has changed recently, however, as both parties have increasingly cooperated in opposition to the ruling Georgian Dream government. 

In an interview with the online news website Netgazeti, Giorgi Ugulava distinguished the Movement for Liberty as being more liberal than the UNM, specifically describing the UNM as populist and communitarian.

Electoral performance

Parliamentary election

Presidential election

Local election

Seats in Municipal assemblies

References

2017 establishments in Georgia (country)
Liberal parties in Georgia (country)
Centre-right parties in Georgia (country)
Liberal conservative parties
Political parties established in 2017
Political parties in Georgia (country)
Pro-European political parties in Georgia (country)